The tracklaying race of 1869 was an unofficial contest between tracklaying crews of the Union Pacific and Central Pacific railroads, held during the construction of the First transcontinental railroad. The competition was to determine who would first reach the meeting place at Promontory, Utah. Starting in 1868 the railroad crews set, and subsequently broke, each other's world records for the longest length of track laid in a single day. This culminated in the April 28, 1869 record set by Chinese and Irish crews of the Central Pacific who laid  of track in one day.

History

Rivalry
In July 1866, the Pacific Railway Act was amended, authorizing the Central Pacific (CP) to build east until it met the line being constructed by the Union Pacific (UP). The amount of land and money each railroad would be granted was proportional to the number of miles of track laid, causing the two railroads to start building in earnest.

Their rivalry was notably unfriendly. In February 1869, crews for the UP and CP were grading parallel routes on the Promontory Range. At that time, the UP's primarily Irish crews began bullying the CP's primarily Chinese crews, first throwing clods of earth and escalating to a series of raids in which the UP crews attempted to dislodge the CP by attacking while wielding pick handles. Eventually, the UP crews began setting off heavy charges without warning, seriously injuring several CP workers; when the CP crews began grading at a higher elevation, they retaliated by setting off a surprise explosion, which buried several UP workers alive.

Tracklaying
Building the railroad started with surveying the route and grading the roadbed; for the CP, grading was delayed by the route chosen through the rugged Sierra mountain range. During the first five years of construction, the CP spent only 95 weeks laying tracks, while the remainder had been consumed in grading.

In the CP's traditional approach to tracklaying, once the grading was complete, a loaded tracklaying car was sent to the end of the line, carrying a single crew and eight pairs of rails along with a commensurate number of ties, spikes, and splices. One pair of rails was unloaded at a time and the tracklaying car only advanced once the crew had completed that pair of rails. When the line curved, the rails were pre-bent (and the inside rail was shortened) prior to being loaded onto the tracklaying car. The slow pace of the tracklaying car and limited manpower that could be brought to bear meant that CP managed to complete only  of track during the first five years of construction from 1863 to 1868, building east from Sacramento, despite adopting speedier techniques for curved rails and splices in 1866.

Meanwhile, the UP had built  from Omaha, Nebraska west to Cheyenne, Wyoming by 1868. UP crews under Casement and his brother Daniel would lay  of track in a single day in August 1867, prompting CP Vice President Collis P. Huntington to ask if they should send a spy to watch the UP at work.

In March 1868, a former UP tracklayer joined the CP, happy to share the UP's technique to speed up tracklaying. Rather than have a single crew take on all aspects of tracklaying work, the crews of the Casement brothers were organized more like an assembly line: crews were specialized, employing more men in total, but having each man be responsible for a limited set of tasks such as rail handling, spiking, splicing, etc. In addition, the tracklaying car was advanced over the loose rails, before they were completely spiked in place, allowing work to take place simultaneously along a longer distance of track. One contemporary newspaper account described the UP process in military terms, with workers divided into armies of suppliers, graders, tie setters, and track-layers. The rapid pace of the work was thought to be affecting its quality, but the tracks laid in this manner had no issues in passing mandatory government inspections, which were required to release funds to the UP.

Record-setting pace
On August 17, 1868, UP crews laid  of track in a single day; their bragging aroused a competitive instinct in Charles Crocker, head of the CP, who instructed his construction superintendent James Harvey Strobridge to beat it. CP crews responded by laying a few feet beyond  on August 19, and UP's riposte was to lay  of track in a single day on October 26, working from 3 AM until midnight.

CP's Huntington, also testifying that day, retorted UP's pace was purchased at the cost of quality. On March 12, 1869 Mark Hopkins sent the coded message "Roving Delia Fish Dance" to Huntington, letting him know his crews were laying  of track per day regularly. This proved the production gains of adopting Casement's techniques and set the stage for the Ten Mile Day of April 28, 1869.

Ten Miles of Track, Laid in One Day

As the two railroad companies approached the meeting point at Promontory Summit, the UP's advance slowed significantly as some of the heaviest work was ahead; at one point, the UP graders were just  ahead of the tracklaying crews. Thomas C. Durant, the vice-president of the UP, reportedly had a bet with Crocker for $10,000; the winner would be determined by whose crews could lay the most track in a single day, but there is no contemporary evidence to prove the bet existed. California Governor Leland Stanford had a much smaller wager of $500 with the chief track-layer, Mr. Horace Minkler, which Stanford was happy to pay.

The CP's first attempt at a tracklaying record was abandoned on April 27, after a locomotive derailed. The CP had laid  of rails that day.

The next day, work began at daybreak. One railcar, fully loaded with 8 pairs of  rails, spikes, and other supplies, was pulled up to the end of the track by teams of horses; when it met an empty car returning to the supply base, the empty car was tipped on its side to allow the loaded car to pass. As the loaded car reached the end of the line, one pair of rails was pulled down and laid over the ties by a team of four rail handlers, then the car was advanced over the loose rails while another team of spikers started spikes to secure the rails. Additional teams finished the spiking and buried the ends of the ties.

A correspondent for the Daily Alta California timed the pace for two carloads; the cars, each containing  of track, were emptied in 80, then 75 seconds. By lunch,  were complete, approximately 6 hours after work began.

The crews took an hour-long break to eat before resuming work, saucily naming the site Camp Victory. After lunch, an hour was spent bending rails for the upcoming route,  a curving ascent. The eight-man rail-laying team refused to be relieved after lunch and continued their work hauling rails off the work cars. When work ceased at 7 PM that night, the CP crews had laid  of track in a single day, setting the record. To prove the track was sound, a locomotive was run over the newly-laid track, completing the route in 40 minutes. CP crews completed the remainder of their part of the line to Promontory Summit the next day. In total, 25,800 ties, 3,520 rails (averaging  each), 55,000 spikes, and 14,080 bolts were used that day, consuming  of material.

A delegation from the Union Pacific had been invited to witness the record attempts. When the first attempt failed on April 27, the UP delegates privately expressed skepticism that their record could be broken; by the end of the Ten-Mile Day, one delegate admitted "the organization of the Central Pacific is far superior to [ours]."

The names of the eight Irish rail-layers, who were responsible for hauling the rails off the loaded cars, and the two men who gauged the track were recorded in foreman George Coley's log book.  The contribution of numerous Chinese workers was undeniable, although the roles they played were not well-described. The relationship between the Chinese and Irish crews of the CP was described as amicable.

Legacy
Some of the UP crews who were denied a chance to break the CP record later worked on the Kansas Pacific, who set a new record with  laid in a single day at Comanche Crossing near Strasburg, Colorado on August 15, 1870, completing the first continuous transcontinental railroad.  Despite the new record that was set in 1870, the Southern Pacific (successor to the CP) continued to claim the record into the early 20th century.

The ten-mile rail segment laid in 1869 (and the Promontory Golden Spike site) was bypassed in 1903 with the completion of the Lucin Cutoff, although service continued for several years on the original route, which the Southern Pacific called its Promontory Branch. The abandoned rails were eventually taken up for scrap and reuse in 1942. At the Golden Spike National Historical Park, the West Auto Tour is a  route that takes tourists to a replica of the sign erected by the CP at the site to commemorate the April 28 record. The original sign is thought to be in the Utah State Capitol building in Salt Lake City; a replacement sign that may have stood at the site is on display at the visitor's center in Promontory, and a replica is displayed at the California State Railroad Museum in Sacramento.

In art
April 28, 1869 is a prominent day in author Frank Chin's 1991 novel Donald Duk; the eponymous protagonist dreams of the events of that day and awakens, outraged to find that history has recorded only the names of the eight Irish tracklayers who worked that day.

Notes

References

External links

 
 
 
 
 
 
 
 

First transcontinental railroad